Tung Kuei-sen (1951 - 3 April 1991) was a member of the Taiwan-based United Bamboo Gang. Along with Chen Chi-li and Wu Tun, he is best known for his murder of dissident journalist Henry Liu in Daly City, California in October 1984.

Murder of Henry Liu
Chen and Wu had initially planned to murder Liu on their own by intercepting him at Fisherman's Wharf; after finding the area to be too crowded, they decided instead to attempt to attack him in his home, and enlisted Tung's help. After murdering Liu, Tung flew back to Taiwan with Chen and Wu, but was forced to flee to Manila a few weeks later during Operation Cleansweep a nationwide anti-gang raid. He fled Manila after being questioned by authorities there during an investigation of the contract murders of two Chinese Filipino families, going to Thailand, and then Brazil, where he was apprehended and in April 1986 extradited to New York City.

Trial
Tung first stood trial in New York State on Federal racketeering charges relating to a United Bamboo conspiracy to smuggle 660 pounds of heroin into the United States; however, he was acquitted of similar racketeering charges relating to Liu's murder due to his testimony that he shot Liu on orders from the Taiwan government, and not as part of a gang-related activity. As Brazil's extradition treaty with the United States specified that they would not extradite fugitives charged with crimes that could result in their execution, the prosecutor did not seek the death penalty. After the first trial, he was extradited from New York to California to stand trial for Liu's murder. Like Chen, Tung stated that he had killed Liu for patriotic reasons. He was found guilty by a jury on 17 March 1988 after just 45 minutes of deliberations.

Sentencing and imprisonment
Tung's sentence of 25 years to life for the murder and two years for the use of a firearm was passed on 12 May; the judge rejected a plea that his sentences be allowed to run concurrently, which could have seen him set free in just six years. According to prosecutors, he would not have been eligible for parole for 17 years and 8 months. He was then sent to Pennsylvania to serve out his term for the drug charges. On 21 February 1991, he was attacked and stabbed by fellow prisoners at the Lewisburg Federal Penitentiary in Lewisburg; after a long struggle to recover from his wounds, he died on 3 April.

References

1951 births
1991 deaths
1980s murders in Taiwan
1984 crimes in Taiwan
1984 murders in Asia
1991 murders in the United States
Triad members
Bamboo Union
Murdered gangsters
Prisoners murdered in custody
Taiwanese people imprisoned abroad
Prisoners and detainees of California
Prisoners who died in United States federal government detention
Taiwanese people who died in prison custody
People murdered in Pennsylvania
Taiwanese people convicted of murder
Deaths by stabbing in the United States
Place of birth missing
People from Taichung
People extradited from Brazil
People extradited to the United States